This is a list of finalists for the 1999 Archibald Prize for portraiture (listed is Artist – Title).

Prize winners
The Prize winners were:
 Euan MacLeod – Self-portrait/head like a hole (Winner: Archibald Prize 1999)
 Deny Christian – Garry McDonald (Winner: Packing Room Prize 1999) (The 1999 Packing Room Prize winner was not selected as a finalist.)
 Evert Ploeg – Deborah Mailman (Winner: People's Choice)
Note that the Packing Room Prize winner was not a finalist.

Finalists
    Rick Amor – Studio self-portrait
    Bruce Armstrong – Spook San (Gary James)
    Li (David) Baohua – Francis Giacco
    Krista Berga – Portrait of Paul Milliss
 David Bromley – Scott Hicks (film director)
    Tom Carment – James Scanlon
    Peter Churcher – John & Tikki
 Adam Cullen – Max Cullen
    Geoffrey Dyer – Margaret Scott (author and poet)
    Graham Fransella – Self Portrait
    Joe Furlonger – Self Portrait With Chinese Figure
    James P Gilmour – Simon Johnson PQF
    Robert Hannaford – Robert Dessaix (in my studio)
 Nicholas Harding – Portrait of Margaret Olley
    Amanda King – Natasha Stott Despoja (politician)
 Bill Leak – Sinclair Hill
 Kerrie Lester – Jimmy Barnes (singer)
 Keith Looby – Paddy McGuinness
    Mathew Lynn – Lucinda Moon
 Euan MacLeod – Self-portrait/head like a hole (Winner: Archibald Prize 1999)
    Carolyn McKay Creecy – Nigel Thomson
 Lewis Miller – Poppy King
    Henry Mulholland – Darren Knight
    David Naseby – Bob Ellis (political commentator)
    Paul Newton – Portrait of Maggie Tabberer (model)
    John Peart – Elisabeth Cummings
 Evert Ploeg – Deborah Mailman (actress) (Winner: People's Choice)
 Sally Robinson – Tony Tan
 Jenny Sages – Meryl Tankard
    Jiawei Shen – William Yang
 Patrick Shirvington – Charles Blackman (Secret of the Golden Flower)
 Salvatore Zofrea – James Strong

See also
Previous year: List of Archibald Prize 1998 finalists
Next year: List of Archibald Prize 2000 finalists
List of Archibald Prize winners

External links
Archibald Prize 1999 finalists official website

1999
Archibald Prize 1999
Archibald Prize 1999
Archibald
Arch